Bray Island is one of the Canadian Arctic islands located in Nunavut, Canada along the southern coast of Baffin Island.

Bray Island was the home of FOX-A, a Distant Early Warning Line and now a North Warning System site. However, Bray Island has no permanent residents.

References

Islands of Foxe Basin
Uninhabited islands of Qikiqtaaluk Region
Former populated places in the Qikiqtaaluk Region